Orenaia helveticalis is a species of moth in the family Crambidae. It is found in Spain, France, Italy, Switzerland, Austria, Slovenia and Germany.

Subspecies
Orenaia helveticalis helveticalis
Orenaia helveticalis ventosalis Chrétien, 1911 (France)
Orenaia helveticalis gedralis P. Leraut, 1996
Orenaia helveticalis murinalis G. Leraut in G. Leraut & P. Leraut, 2011

References

Moths described in 1851
Evergestinae
Moths of Europe